The 2011 Northeast Conference men's basketball tournament took place March 3, 6, and 9, 2011, on campus sites. The semifinal games was televised on MSG Network, and the finals were on ESPN2. The winner, Long Island, received the NEC's automatic berth in the 2011 NCAA tournament.

Format
For the seventh straight year, the NEC Men's Basketball Tournament will consist of an eight-team playoff format with all games played at the home of the higher seed. After the quarterfinals, the teams will be reseeded so the highest remaining seed plays the lowest remaining seed in the semifinals. Bryant is in transition to D-I and remains ineligible for any post-season tournaments and thus not allowed to participate.

Bracket

Asterisk denotes an overtime.

All-tournament team
Tournament MVP in bold.

References

Northeast Conference men's basketball tournament
Tournament
Northeast Conference men's basketball tournament
Northeast Conference men's basketball tournament